The Welsh Football League Division Two, (last known as the Nathanielcars.co.uk  Welsh League Division Two, for sponsorship reasons) was a football league and forms the fourth level of the Welsh football league system in South Wales.

If the team which finishes top of the division has good enough ground facilities, traditionally it was promoted to the Welsh Football League Division One and is replaced by the team finishing bottom of Division One. The team finishing in bottom position is relegated to the Welsh Football League Division Three.  For the 2019–20 season promotion was to the newly formed Ardal Leagues at Tier 3 and relegation was to one of the regional leagues.

From its inception in 1904 it always sat below the top flight of the Welsh League, or the Rhymney Valley League and Glamorgan League as it was known until 1912. This division has changed its title on numerous occasions to follow suit of the other leagues within the competition; for seven years in the 1980s it was known as the Premier Division as the top flight adopted the National Division name, while Division Two was split into two sections - A & B and West & East - for many years before 1965.

In 1992 it became level three of the Welsh Football Pyramid following the creation of the Welsh Premier League.

After the creation of the Cymru South, for the 2019–20 season, the league was rebranded and Welsh Football League Division Two incorporated the former Division Three teams.

Member clubs for the final 2019–20 season

 Aberdare Town
 Abertillery Bluebirds
 AFC Porth
 Albion Rovers
 Chepstow Town 
 Newport City 
 Panteg 
 Penrhiwceiber Rangers 
 Pontyclun 
 Tredegar Town 
 Treharris Athletic Western 
 Trethomas Bluebirds 
 Treowen Stars
 West End 
 Ynyshir Albions
 Ynysygerwn

Champions (as level 2 of the Welsh League)
Information from 1913-14 onwards is sourced from the Welsh Football Data Archive section for the Welsh Football League.

Rhymney Valley League Division 2
 1905–06: Abergavenny
 1906–07: Pontlottyn
 1907–08: Treharris Reserves
 1908–09: Gilfach
 1909–10: shared between Cwm and Troedyrhiw
Glamorgan League Division 2
 1910–11: Pontlottyn Town
 1911–12: Troedyrhiw
 1912–13: Troedyrhiw

Welsh Football League Division 2

 1913–14: Troedyrhiw
 1914–15: Bargoed

 1915–20: no competitions
 1919–20: Aberdare Amateurs
 1920–21: Rhymney
 1921–22: unknown 
 1922–23: unknown 
 1923–24: unknown 
 1924–25: unknown
 1925–26:
 Section A: Llanbradach 
 Section B: Troedyrhiw Welfare 
 1926–27:
 Section A: Ystrad Mynach 
 Section B: Troedyrhiw Welfare
 1927–28:unknown
 1928–29: Abertysswyg
 1929–30: unknown
 1930–31: unknown
 1931–32: Troedyrhiw
 1932–33:
 Eastern Division: Gelli Colliery
 Western Division: Llanelly A 
 1933–34: unknown
 1934–35: unknown
 1935–36: unknown
 1936–37: unknown
 Eastern Division: Abercynon
 Western Division: Milford Haven
 1937–38: unknown
 1939–45: Football suspended due to World War Two
 1945–46:
 Eastern Division: Lovell's Athletic reserves 
 Western Division: Brynna United
 1946–47:
 Eastern Division: Penrhiwceiber
 Western Division: Briton Ferry Athletic
 1947–48:
 Eastern Division: Bargoed United 
 Western Division: Pembroke Borough
 1948–49
 Eastern Division: Senghenydd Town
 Western Division: Cwmparc
 1949–50: 
 Eastern Division: Nelson Welfare
 Western Division: Llanelly
 1950–51:
 Eastern Division: Abergavenny Thursdays
 Western Division: Cwmparc 
 1951–52:
 Eastern Division: Barry Town
 Western Division: Aberystwyth Town
 1952–53:
 Eastern Division: Pontllanfraith 
 Western Division: Tonyrefail
 1953–54:
 Eastern Division: Nelson
 Western Division: Atlas Sports (Swansea)
 1954–55:
 Eastern Division: Brecon Corinthians
 Western Division: Gwynfi Welfare
 1955–56:
 Eastern Division: Cwmparc
 Western Division: Haverfordwest
 1956–57:
 Eastern Division: Cardiff Corinthians
 Western Division: Port Talbot Athletic
 1957–58:
 Eastern Division: Barry Town
 Western Division: Llanelly 
 1958–59:
 Eastern Division: Tredomen Works 
 Western Division: Bettws FC (Ammanford)
 1959–60:
 Eastern Division: Cardiff Corinthians 
 Western Division: Carmarthen Town 
 1960–61:
 Eastern Division: Ebbw Vale
 Western Division: Pontardawe Athletic
 1961–62:
 Eastern Division: Ferndale Athletic 
 Western Division: Port Talbot Athletic
 1962–63:
 Eastern Division: Bridgend Town
 Western Division: Milford United
 1963–64:
 Eastern Division: South Wales Switchgear 
 Western Division: Clydach United

Welsh Football League Division 1

 1964–65: Ebbw Vale
 1965–66: Ammanford Town  
 1966–67: Tonyrefail Welfare 
 1967–68: Caerleon 
 1968–69: Caerau Athletic 
 1969–70: Swansea University 
 1970–71: Cardiff Corinthians  
 1971–72: Briton Ferry Athletic 
 1972–73: Lewistown 
 1973–74: Pontllanfraith  
 1974–75: Spencer Works
 1975–76: Cardiff College of Education
 1976–77: Caerau Athletic
 1977–78: Cardiff Corinthians 
 1978–79: Maesteg Park Athletic
 1979–80: Haverfordwest County
 1980–81: Sully
 1981–82: Brecon Corinthians
 1982–83: Abercynon Athletic

Welsh Football League Premier Division

 1983–84: Sully
 1984–85: Cardiff Corinthians 
 1985–86: Sully
 1986–87: AFC Cardiff
 1987–88: Afan Lido
 1988–89: Afan Lido
 1989–90: Sully

Welsh Football League Division 1
 1990–91: Morriston Town
 1991–92: Blaenrhondda

Champions (as Step 3 of the pyramid)
Welsh Football League Division 2

 1992–93: AFC Porth
 1993–94: Taffs Well
 1994–95: Penrhiwceiber Rangers
 1995–96: Grange Harlequins
 1996–97: Bridgend Town
 1997–98: Pontardawe Town
 1998–99: Penrhiwceiber Rangers
 1999–2000: Fields Park Pontllanfraith
 2000–01: Garw Athletic
 2001–02: Garden Village
 2002–03: Dinas Powys
 2003–04: Skewen Athletic
 2004–05: Pontardawe Town
 2005–06: Pontypridd Town
 2006–07: Garw Athletic
 2007–08: Bettws
 2008–09: West End
 2009–10: Penrhiwceiber Rangers
 2010–11: Ton Pentre
 2011–12: Monmouth Town
 2012–13: Goytre
 2013–14: Cardiff Metropolitan University
 2014–15: Barry Town United
 2015–16: Caldicot Town
 2016–17: Llanelli Town 
 2017–18: Llantwit Major  
 2018–19: STM Sports

Champions (as Step 4 of the pyramid)
Welsh Football League Division 2

 2019–20: Penrhiwceiber Rangers

References

See also
Football in Wales
Welsh football league system
Welsh Cup
Welsh League Cup
FAW Premier Cup
List of football clubs in Wales
List of stadiums in Wales by capacity

2
4
Wales
2020 disestablishments in Wales
Sports leagues disestablished in 2020
Defunct football competitions in Wales